NMS Regele Carol I was a passenger ship of the Romanian Maritime Service and later a warship of the Romanian Navy, serving as both minelayer and seaplane tender. She was completed and commissioned in 1898 and sunk in 1941, during World War II.

Construction and career 

Regele Carol I was initially built as a passenger steamer. She was completed by the Fairfield Shipbuilding and Engineering Company in Glasgow, Scotland, United Kingdom. The twin-screw ship was formally christened by the King of Romania and commissioned in July 1898. Shortly after her commissioning, her Romanian owners changed her fuel from coal to a mixture of half coal and half oil (two separate boilers). This conversion offered several advantages: the ship became slightly faster, the fuel consumption dropped by around half (60-80 tons of oil instead of 150 tons of coal required to cover the same distance) and the size of her crew was reduced. The steamer displaced 2,653 tons and her power plant had an output of 6,500 horse power, generating a top speed of 18 knots. She measured 93.2 meters in length, with a beam of 12.8 meters and a draught of 5 meters. Internal work (mainly the music room) was by Glasgow architect William Leiper.

In 1916, after Romania joined World War I, Regele Carol I was leased to the Imperial Russian Navy and converted into a warship. She served as both minelayer and seaplane tender, carrying one aircraft as well as 28 mines. She was also armed with two 150 mm naval guns. After briefly being renamed Ion Roate in early 1917 (she was also known as Korol Carl in the Russian Navy), she was returned to Romania at some point between 1917 and 1919.

World War II and sinking
At the start of Operation Barbarossa in June 1941, Regele Carol I and two other Romanian minelayers (Amiral Murgescu and Dacia) laid a flanking barrage of mines off Constanța for the protection of the port. In October 1941, these mines sank the Soviet M-class submarines M-58 and M-34.

On 7 October 1941, Regele Carol I took part in a large-scale minelaying operation off the Bulgarian coast. The so-called Operation Varna consisted in the minelaying of the Bulgarian coast by the Romanian minelayers , Regele Carol I and Dacia, escorted by the Romanian s Năluca, Sborul and Smeul, the Romanian gunboats  and Căpitan Dumitrescu (both of the same class) and the Bulgarian torpedo boats , Smeli and Hrabri (all three of the same class). On 10 October, Regele Carol I was sunk off Varna, Bulgaria, by a mine laid by the Soviet submarine L-4.

References 

1898 ships
Ships built in Scotland
World War I naval ships of Russia
World War I naval ships of Romania
Maritime incidents in October 1941
World War II shipwrecks in the Black Sea
World War II minelayers of Romania
Seaplane tenders
Ships sunk by mines
Ships sunk by Soviet submarines